Eric Neal Peterson  (born October 2, 1946) is a Canadian stage, television, and film actor, known for his roles in three major Canadian series – Street Legal (1987–1994), Corner Gas (2004–2009), and This is Wonderland (2004–2006), as well as Corner Gas Animated (2018–2021).

Career

Stage
In 1971, Peterson began his acting career when he helped found the collective theatre company Tamahnous Theatre in Vancouver, British Columbia. There he received major roles in versions of The Bacchae and Nijinsky, both directed by John Gray.

In 1974, he moved to Toronto, Ontario, and joined Theatre Passe Muraille, a leading collective ensemble in Canada. He had main roles in productions of The Farm Show, The West Show, Them Donnelly’s, and 1837: The Farmers' Revolt. It was in this latter Rick Salutin production that he gained the greatest recognition, playing William Lyon Mackenzie and Lady Backwash.

In 1976, Peterson began to collaborate with John Gray again, writing Billy Bishop Goes to War. The play, which premiered in Vancouver in 1978, went on tour internationally, garnering positive reviews on Broadway, where Peterson won the Clarence Derwent Award for most promising performer, in London's West End. He was also nominated for Best Actor at the Edinburgh Festival Mainstage. In 1998, Peterson acted in the play once more at the Canadian Stage in Toronto.

Peterson's later stage appearances include Love and Anger at the Factory Theatre, Health (another collaboration with John Gray) at the Vancouver Playhouse and the lead role in Richard Ill at the Young People’s Theatre.  In October 2000, he performed in Hysteria at the Canadian Stage and in January 2001, he appeared in Clout at the National Arts Centre in Ottawa.

Between November 20 and December 13, 2008, Peterson starred as family patriarch and business man Helge Klingenfeldt in The Company Theatre's production of Festen at the Berkeley Street Theatre in Toronto, Ontario, Canada.

Between August 8 and 29, 2009, Peterson reprised the lead role in Billy Bishop Goes to War at the Soulpepper Theatre Company in Toronto.  The company announced that the production was planned to return in 2010. In the same year, he played Wiff Roach in Soulpepper's revival of David French's 1973 play Of the Fields, Lately. 

He's currently playing the role of Percy Schmeiser in the docu-drama Seeds.

Television
Until Corner Gas, his most famous role on television was his award-winning role as Leon Robinovitch, a left-wing lawyer, on Street Legal. His more notable television work includes 1998's Nothing Sacred (a movie for which he also co-produced and appeared in the stage version), Night Heat and This Is Wonderland. He also appeared as Hank Stewart in the Hippocratic Oath episode of Alfred Hitchcock Presents for AHF Film Productions.

In total, Peterson has appeared in fifty-two movie and television productions. He also appeared in an infomercial for Amnesty International. He also appeared in the Goosebumps episode "Shocker on Shock Street" as Mr. Wright

Peterson's most famous television role was that of Oscar Leroy on the Canadian television program Corner Gas. Peterson played the father of Brent Leroy (played by Brent Butt), who inherited the gas station after his father decided to retire. Much to the dismay of his son and his wife Emma (played by Janet Wright), he uses his new-found free time to unwittingly annoy his family and the town at large. Following the end of that show's run, Peterson made a guest appearance on the show Dan for Mayor, a show starring his former Corner Gas co-star Fred Ewanuick. As of 2014 he appears in The Best Laid Plans as Jerry Stockton.

Since January 2007, he has been performing in Half Life, a play by John Mighton, at the Canadian Stage. According to The Canadian Encyclopedia, "his fresh, energetic, natural acting style has made him popular with Canadian audiences, and he continues to be a mainstay of Canadian television."

Personal life
Peterson was born in Indian Head, Saskatchewan, Canada. He is married to fellow actor and People for Education executive director Annie Kidder, who is the sister of Margot Kidder. Peterson and his wife live in Toronto, Ontario, with their two daughters, although he still frequents his home province of Saskatchewan, where he owns a cottage on Katepwa Lake in the Qu'Appelle Valley near his hometown.

Awards
Peterson has won numerous awards over his career. For his portrayal of Leon Robinovitch on Street Legal, he was nominated for the Gemini Award for Best Performance by a Lead Actor in a Continuing Dramatic Role six times in 1987, 1989, and every year from 1992 through 1995. He tied for the win with Winston Rekert (for Adderly) the first year and won in outright the next two. He has also been nominated twice under Best Ensemble Performance in a Comedy Program or Series with Corner Gas at the Gemini Awards and once for Best Performance by an Actor in a Featured Supporting Role in a Dramatic Series for Episode 4 of This is Wonderland for his portrayal of Judge Malone His fourth Gemini Award came in 2001 for Best Performance in a Pre-School Program.

He has also been nominated four times for Canadian Comedy Awards for his role on Corner Gas. In 2004, he was nominated (alongside fellow Corner Gas actor Brent Butt) in the "Pretty Funny Television Performance – Male" category. In 2007, he was nominated for "Best Male Performance."

In addition, on May 21, 1996, Peterson received an honorary Doctor of Letters in drama from the University of Saskatchewan; the head of the drama department, Henry Woolf, made the presentation. In 1999, the 20th anniversary edition of his play Billy Bishop Goes To War won him Dora Awards for Best Play, Best Direction, and Best Performance. He had previously received a Dora Award nomination for his role in Escape from Happiness. A 1982 CBC television adaptation garnered him an ACTRA award nomination. In May 2013 he received a Governor General's Performing Arts Award for his work for his lifetime contributions to Canadian theatre. For his lifelong contributions to the arts he received an Honorary Doctorate of Fine Arts from the University of Regina (2019).

Filmography

Film

Television

Awards and nominations

References

External links

Eric Peterson at Northern Stars

1946 births
Living people
Male actors from Saskatchewan
Canadian male film actors
Canadian male stage actors
Canadian male television actors
Canadian male voice actors
Clarence Derwent Award winners
Dora Mavor Moore Award winners
Best Actor in a Drama Series Canadian Screen Award winners
Members of the Order of Canada
University of British Columbia alumni
Governor General's Performing Arts Award winners
Canadian Comedy Award winners
Male actors from Toronto